This is a recap of the 1994 season for the Professional Bowlers Association (PBA) Tour.  It was the tour's 36th season, and consisted of 30 events.

History was made at the PBA National Championship when, for the first time, two brothers faced each other for a PBA title. David Traber defeated his elder brother, Dale, to take his first PBA title and first major. In the same tournament, 47-year-old Johnny Petraglia rolled the PBA's seventh televised 300 game before being defeated by Dale Traber in the next match.  Butch Soper would toss the PBA's eighth televised 300 game later in the season at the Hilton Hotels Classic.

Justin Hromek made his second-ever PBA Tour victory count, winning the BPAA U.S. Open. Norm Duke captured the Tournament of Champions among his five titles for the season, and was voted PBA Player of the year.

During the season, Pete Weber became the PBA's career money leader, surpassing Hall of Famer Marshall Holman.

Tournament schedule

References

External links
1994 Season Schedule

Professional Bowlers Association seasons
1994 in bowling